The fire bar danio, Maetaeng danio, or tiger danio (Devario maetaengensis), is a small freshwater fish in the minnow family found in the Ping River basin. Its description includes:
 Maximum length: 2 inches 
 Colors: Brown, yellow, green, red  
 Temperature preference: Unknown 
 pH preference: 6 to 7 
 Hardness preference: Soft to medium 
 Salinity preference: Low to medium 
 Compatibility: Good but fast like most danios 
 Lifespan: Unknown, probably three to four years 
 Ease of keeping: Moderate 
 Ease of breeding: Moderate to hard

References

External links
Devario maetaengensis

Devario
Taxa named by Fang Fang Kullander
Fish described in 1997
Fish of Thailand